Mónika Balsai (born 13 December 1977 in Vác) is a Hungarian actress.

Selected filmography
Liza, the Fox-Fairy (2015)
Kills on Wheels (2016)
Jupiter's Moon (2017)

Selected television

References

External links

1977 births
Living people
Hungarian film actresses
Hungarian television actresses
Hungarian child actresses
People from Vác